Pankaj Jindal is the co-founder of Sense Talent Labs (Sense HQ), located in San Francisco, CA. Previously he was the CEO of Akraya Inc (April 2013 - November 2015), a staffing and recruiting firm located in Silicon Valley, CA. Pankaj has been in business since 1999. He is a charter member of The Indus Entrepreneurs (TiE) Silicon Valley.

Awards and recognition 
In 2014, Pankaj made the Silicon Valley Business Journals "40 Under 40" List.

References 

Indian business executives
Punjab Engineering College alumni
Living people
Year of birth missing (living people)